The 2006 AAA Championships was an outdoor track and field competition organised by the Amateur Athletic Association (AAA), held from 15 to 16 July at the Manchester Regional Arena in Manchester, England. It was considered the de facto national championships for the United Kingdom.

It was the final major edition of the long-running competition, as it was replaced by the UK Athletics-organised British Athletics Championships the following year. This signalled a move away from the English AAA-led management of the sport, in favour of a centralised, national and elite-focused championships.

Medal summary

Men

Women

References

AAA Championships
AAA Championships
Athletics Outdoor
AAA Championships
Sports competitions in Manchester
Athletics competitions in England